Willem Anton Frederik "Kick" Stokhuyzen (October 7, 1930 in Soerabaja – January 12, 2009 in Voorburg) was a Dutch politician, radio broadcaster, television presenter and voice actor.

See also
List of Dutch politicians

References

1930 births
2009 deaths
People's Party for Freedom and Democracy politicians
Dutch radio personalities
Dutch male voice actors
Municipal councillors in South Holland
People from Surabaya
World War II civilian prisoners held by Japan